Cytomegalovirus colitis, also known as CMV colitis, is an inflammation of the colon.

Causes
The infection is spread by saliva, urine, respiratory droplets, sexual contact, and blood transfusions. Most people are exposed to the virus in their lifetime, but it usually produces mild or no symptoms in healthy people.

However, serious CMV infections can occur in people with weakened immune systems. This includes patients receiving chemotherapy for cancer and patients on immune-suppressing medicines following an organ transplant.

In rare instances, more severe CMV infection involving the GI tract has been reported in people with a healthy immune system.

Risk factors
The systemic use of corticosteroids in the context of inflammatory bowel disease.

Diagnosis
CMV colitis may be clinically manifested with diarrhea (usually non-bloody), abdominal pain, weight loss and anorexia.
The diagnosis of CMV colitis is based on serology, CMV antigen testing and colonoscopy with biopsy. 
Clinical suspicion should be aroused in the setting of immunocompromised patient but it is much rarer in immunocompetent patient.
Although it is known that CMV colitis is almost always caused by reactivation of latent CMV infection in immunocompromised patients, new infection of CMV or reinfection of different strain of CMV can cause colitis in immunocompetent hosts.
Because asymptomatic CMV viremia and viruria is common and about 1/3 of symptomatic CMV infection is caused by reinfection of different strain of CMV, the diagnosis of CMV colitis needs more direct causality. It is practically achieved by colonoscopy or sigmoidoscopy tissue sampling and pathological evidence of CMV infection under microscope, more specifically macroscopic picture will show many ulcers that appear on the mucous membrane and microscopically the biopsy will show intranuclear and cytoplasmic inclusion bodies. Positive CMV IgG doesn't necessarily mean that it is reactivation of latent infection because of the possibility of reinfection of different strain.

Treatment
The usual treatment is antivirals, specifically ganciclovir or valganciclovir.  Severe CMV colitis may lead a colectomy.

See also
 Crohn's disease

References

HIV/AIDS
Cytomegalovirus-associated diseases
Colitis